The discography of the Serbian punk rock–post-punk band Pekinška Patka comprises two studio albums, three singles, and one compilation album.

The band had their first recordings released on the double A-side single "Biti ružan, pametan i mlad" / "Bela šljiva" ("To Be Ugly, Smart and Young" / "White Plum") in 1979, by Jugoton. The single is the first Serbian punk rock release. The band's debut album, Plitka poezija (Shallow Poetry), released in 1980, is the first Serbian punk rock album. The album was ushered by the single "Bolje da nosim kratku kosu" ("I Better Be Wearing Short Hair"), and after the single release, the band's default lineup changed, which influenced the further musical development of the band. The new lineup firstly released the single "Bila je tako lijepa" ("She Was So Beautiful"), and then moved towards post-punk, with the release of the band's second and final album Strah od monotonije (Fear Of Monotony). After the album release, the band split up. All of the band's recordings, released on albums and singles, appeared on the Pekinška patka compilation album in 2006.

Studio albums

Compilation albums

Singles

References 
 EX YU ROCK enciklopedija 1960-2006, Janjatović Petar; 
 Pekinška Patka at Discogs

Discographies of Serbian artists
Punk rock group discographies